The American Chamber Ballet was a troupe of 15 professional dancers founded by Joel Benjamin.

Though they operating out of Carnegie Hall, the company rehearsed at Trutti Gasparinetti's studio. They performed and toured throughout the United States during the 1970s.

The company was presented by Kazuko Hillyer International and Pacific World Artists, with nearly 100 performances scheduled in its final year; the group disbanded due to financial difficulties in 1976.

Former Dancers
Shelagh McKenna
Audrey Ross
Lawrence Leritz
Toni Ann Gardella
Trutti Gasparinetti
Takuya Horimoto
Denise Plouffe
Ernesta Corvino

Ballet companies in the United States
Dance companies in New York City
1970 establishments in New York City
Performing groups established in 1970